The heroic theory of invention and scientific development is the view that the principal authors of inventions and scientific discoveries are unique heroic individuals—i.e., "great scientists" or "geniuses".

Competing hypothesis
A competing hypothesis (that of multiple discovery) is that most inventions and scientific discoveries are made independently and simultaneously by multiple inventors and scientists. 

The multiple-discovery hypothesis may be most patently exemplified in the evolution of mathematics, since mathematical knowledge is highly unified and any advances need, as a general rule, to be built from previously established results through a process of deduction. Thus, the development of infinitesimal calculus into a systematic discipline did not occur until the development of analytic geometry, the former being credited to both Sir Isaac Newton and Gottfried Leibniz, and the latter to both René Descartes and Pierre de Fermat.

See also
Genius
Great man theory
Hive mind
List of multiple discoveries
Multiple discovery
People known as the father or mother of something
Scientific priority
Scientific theory
Discovery and invention controversies

References

Further reading 

 Epstein, Ralph C. 1926. "Industrial Invention: Heroic, or Systematic?" The Quarterly Journal of Economics 40(2):232–72. . .
 Johansson, Frans. 2004. The Medici Effect: What Elephants and Epidemics Can Teach Us About Innovation. US: Harvard Business School Press. .
 Merton, Robert K. 1957. "Priorities in Scientific Discovery: A Chapter in the Sociology of Science." American Sociological Review 22(6):635–59. . .
 —— 1961. "Singletons and Multiples in Scientific Discovery: A Chapter in the Sociology of Science." Proceedings of the American Philosophical Society 105(5):470–86. 
 Shireman, William K. 1999. "Business strategies for sustainable profits: systems thinking in practice." Systems Research and Behavioral Science 16(5):453–62. .
 Turney, Peter. 15 January 2007. "The Heroic Theory of Scientific Development." Apperceptual.

External links
 http://www.philsci.com/book2-2.htm
 http://www.newyorker.com/reporting/2008/05/12/080512fa_fact_gladwell?currentPage=all

Discovery and invention controversies
History of scientific method
Heuristics
Theories of history
Innovation